Ponta Creek is a stream in the U.S. states of Alabama and Mississippi. It is a tributary to the Sucarnoochee River.

Ponta is a name derived from the Choctaw language purported to mean "mouse". Variant names are "Panthe Creek" and "Ponti Creek".

The Choctaw settlement of Coosha was located on Ponta Creek. One of the three main divisions of the Choctaw tribe, the Eastern Division, lived in the area around Ponta Creek.

References

Rivers of Alabama
Rivers of Sumter County, Alabama
Rivers of Mississippi
Rivers of Kemper County, Mississippi
Rivers of Lauderdale County, Mississippi
Alabama placenames of Native American origin
Mississippi placenames of Native American origin